Loïcia Demougeot (born 31 January 2002) is a French ice dancer. With her skating partner, Théo Le Mercier, she is the 2023 International Challenge Cup silver medalist. 

Earlier in their career, Demougeot and Le Mercier twice finished with in the top eight at the World Junior Championships (2019; 2020) and won two-time silver medalists on the ISU Junior Grand Prix series (2019 JGP France; 2019 JGP Poland), qualifying for the 2019–20 Junior Grand Prix Final.

Career

Early years 
Demougeot began learning to skate in 2008. She teamed up with Théo Le Mercier in 2015. The two made their international debut in February 2016 at the Bavarian Open. They debuted on the ISU Junior Grand Prix series in August of the same year.

Demougeot/Le Mercier qualified to the final segment at the 2018 World Junior Championships in Sofia, Bulgaria. They ranked fourteenth in the short dance, fifteenth in the free dance, and fifteenth overall.

In February 2019, they won the French national junior title for the first time. They placed seventh in the rhythm dance, ninth in the free dance, and eighth overall at the 2019 World Junior Championships in Zagreb, Croatia.

Beginning the 2019–20 season on the Junior Grand Prix, Demougeot/Le Mercier won silver medals at both JGP France and JGP Croatia, qualifying for the first time to the Junior Grand Prix Final, where they placed fifth.  Winning a second consecutive national junior title, they then placed sixth at the 2020 World Junior Championships.

2021–22 season
Following the COVID-19 pandemic causing the cancellation of what would have been their final international junior season, Demougeot/Le Mercier moved up to the senior ranks for the 2021/22 season. They made their Challenger series debut at the 2021 CS Lombardia Trophy, placing ninth. Making their Grand Prix debut at the 2021 Internationaux de France, they finished ninth among ten teams. After winning the bronze medal at their first senior French nationals, Demougeot/Le Mercier made their European Championships debut, finishing sixteenth.

2022–23 season
Demougeot/Le Mercier began the 2022–23 season at the 2022 CS Lombardia Trophy, where they finished in fifth place. Given two Grand Prix assignments, they finished fourth at both the 2022 Skate America and the 2022 Grand Prix de France. Speaking after the latter, an enthused Le Mercier said: "if someone would have told us before the Grand Prix season that we would end up with fourth place, we wouldn't have believed it."

After winning the silver medal at the French championships, Demougeot/Le Mercier were seventh at the 2023 European Championships.

Programs 
(with Le Mercier)

Competitive highlights 
GP: Grand Prix; CS: Challenger Series; JGP: Junior Grand Prix

 with Le Mercier

References

External links 
 

2002 births
French female ice dancers
Living people
Sportspeople from Belfort
21st-century French women